Reinis Rozitis (born 1 September 1982) is a Latvian bobsledder who has competed since 2003. He is a brakeman. His best Bobsleigh World Cup finish was second in the four-man event at Lake Placid in December 2006.

Rozītis also finished 21st in the four-man event at the 2006 Winter Olympics in Turin.

His best finish at the FIBT World Championships was seventh in the four-man event at St. Moritz in 2007.

References
FIBT profile

1982 births
Bobsledders at the 2006 Winter Olympics
Latvian male bobsledders
Living people
Olympic bobsledders of Latvia